Dimitris Paridis (20 September 1945 – 22 August 2015) was a Greek footballer who played as a forward.

Career
Paridis was born in Agios Andreas Kavala, to a family that hailed from Nicopolis in Pontus. He first started playing football for Keravnos Agios Andreas, a local football team in Kavala. In 1961, he debuted for AEK Kavala which later merged with other teams in that city to form Kavala. After two seasons in the Second Division he transferred to PAOK in the summer of 1968. 
He played with PAOK at 183 championship games scoring 49 goals. With PAOK he was won 2 Greek Cups (1972, 1974) and 1 Greek Championship (1976). He ended his career in 1977.

Personal
Paridis died after a long battle with cancer at age 69. The stadium of Agios Andreas Kavala is named in his honor.

External links
 «Έφυγε» ο Δημήτρης Παρίδης

1945 births
2015 deaths
Greek Macedonians
Greek footballers
Greece international footballers
Super League Greece players
PAOK FC players
Kavala F.C. players
Association football forwards
People from Kavala (regional unit)
Footballers from Eastern Macedonia and Thrace